Akkalkot Assembly constituency (250) is one of the 288 Vidhan Sabha (legislative assembly) constituencies of Maharashtra state, western India. This constituency is located in Solapur district. It is a segment of Solapur (Lok Sabha constituency).

Geographical scope
The constituency comprises Akkalkot taluka and Boramani, Musti and Valsang revenue circles of Solapur South taluka.

Members of Legislative Assembly

Election results

2019

2014

2009
 Patil Sidramappa Malkappa (BJP) : 92,496  votes   
 Siddharam Satlingappa Mhetre (INC) : 91,111

1962 
 Nirmalaraje Vijayasinh Bhosale (INC) : 27,291 votes 
 Shankareppa Basappa Lodapure (IND) : 6,306

References

Assembly constituencies of Solapur district
Assembly constituencies of Maharashtra